Olde Stockdale is a neighborhood and census-designated place in Kern County, California. The population was 568 at the 2020 census.

Geography 
It is entirely surrounded by Bakersfield city limits.

According to the United States Census Bureau, the CDP has a total area of 0.407 square miles (1.06 km2), all of it land.

History 
Olde Stockdale is constructed around Stockdale Country Club, at the historic site of Tevis Mansion. The community, formerly on the outskirts of Bakersfield, has become surrounded by the city. Olde Stockdale residents refused annexation into Bakersfield in 1979.

References 

Populated places in Kern County, California
Census-designated places in California